Vepris is a genus of plant in family Rutaceae. It comprises around 90 species, mainly from tropical Africa, Madagascar and the Mascarene Islands and at a lesser extent Arabia and India.

Species
, Plants of the World Online (PoWO) accepted the following species:

Vepris adamaouae Onana
Vepris afzelii (Engl.) Mziray
Vepris allenii I.Verd.
Vepris amaniensis (Engl.) Mziray
Vepris ampody H.Perrier
Vepris aralioides H.Perrier
Vepris araliopsioides Onana
Vepris arenicola H.Perrier
Vepris arushensis Kokwaro
Vepris bachmannii (Engl.) Mziray
Vepris bali Cheek
Vepris bilocularis (Wight & Arn.) Engl.
Vepris boiviniana (Baill.) Mziray
Vepris borenensis (M.G.Gilbert) W.Mziray, synonym of Teclea borenensis, unplaced name according to PoWO
Vepris bremekampii (I.Verd.) Mziray
Vepris calcicola H.Perrier
Vepris carringtoniana Mendonça
Vepris cauliflora H.Perrier
Vepris dainellii (Pic.Serm.) Kokwaro
Vepris darcyi Labat, M.Pignal & O.Pascal
Vepris decaryana H.Perrier
Vepris densiflora (Baker) I.Verd.
Vepris dicarpella H.Perrier
Vepris drummondii Mendonça
Vepris ebolowensis (Engl.) Onana
Vepris eggelingii (Kokwaro) Mziray
Vepris elegantissima F.White & Pannell
Vepris elliotii (Radlk.) I.Verd.
Vepris eugeniifolia (Engl.) I.Verd.
Vepris fadenii (Kokwaro) Mziray
Vepris fanshawei Mendonça
Vepris felicis Breteler
Vepris fer Cheek
Vepris fitoravina H.Perrier
Vepris gabonensis (Pierre) Mziray
Vepris gamopetala H.Perrier
Vepris gerrardii (I.Verd.) E.J.D.Schmidt
Vepris glaberrima (Engl.) J.B.Hall ex D.J.Harris
Vepris glandulosa (Hoyle & Leakey) Kokwaro
Vepris glomerata (F.Hoffm.) Engl.
Vepris gossweileri (I.Verd.) Mziray
Vepris grandifolia (Engl.) Mziray
Vepris hanangensis (Kokwaro) Mziray
Vepris heterophylla (Engl.) Letouzey
Vepris hiernii Gereau
Vepris humbertii H.Perrier
Vepris lanceolata (Lam.) G.Don
Vepris leandriana H.Perrier
Vepris lecomteana (Pierre) Cheek & T.Heller
Vepris lepidota Capuron
Vepris letouzeyi Onana
Vepris louisii G.C.C.Gilbert
Vepris louvelii H.Perrier
Vepris macedoi (Exell & Mendonça) Mziray
Vepris macrophylla (Baker) I.Verd.
Vepris mandangoana Lisowski
Vepris mbamensis Onana
Vepris mendoncana Mziray
Vepris mildbraediana G.M.Schulze
Vepris montisbambutensis Onana
Vepris morogorensis (Kokwaro) Mziray
Vepris myrei (Exell & Mendonça) Mziray
Vepris natalensis (Sond.) Mziray
Vepris ngamensis I.Verd.
Vepris nitida I.Verd.
Vepris nobilis (Delile) Mziray
Vepris noldeae (Exell & Mendonça) Mziray
Vepris occidentalis Cheek & Onana
Vepris oubanguensis (Aubrév. & Pellegr.) Onana
Vepris parvicalyx H.Perrier
Vepris peraperta H.Perrier
Vepris polymorpha H.Perrier
Vepris reflexa I.Verd.
Vepris renieri (G.C.C.Gilbert) Mziray
Vepris rogersii (Mendonça) Mziray
Vepris samburuensis Kokwaro
Vepris sansibarensis (Engl.) Mziray
Vepris schliebenii Mildbr.
Vepris sclerophylla H.Perrier
Vepris soyauxii (Engl.) Mziray
Vepris spathulata (Engl.) H.Perrier
Vepris stolzii I.Verd.
Vepris suaveolens (Engl.) Mziray
Vepris termitaria Mendonça
Vepris trichocarpa (Engl.) Mziray
Vepris trifoliolata (Engl.) Mziray
Vepris uguenensis Engl.
Vepris unifoliolata (Baill.) Labat, M.Pignal & O.Pascal
Vepris verdoorniana (Exell & Mendonça) Mziray
Vepris welwitschii (Hiern) Exell
Vepris whitei Mendonça
Vepris zambesiaca S.Moore

References

 
Taxonomy articles created by Polbot
Zanthoxyloideae genera